Lucas Emanuel Álvarez (born 9 March 1994) is an Argentine professional footballer who plays as a goalkeeper for Atlas.

Career
Álvarez first appeared in the Chacarita Juniors first-team in 2015 when he was an unused substitute for a Copa Argentina match against Atlas in April 2015. He wasn't involved again until the 2016–17 campaign, which was a season spent on the bench as he was unused twenty-five times as Chacarita won promotion to the 2017–18 Primera División. However, Álvarez did make his professional debut towards the end of that season in the Copa Argentina. He played the full ninety minutes as the club were knocked out by Guillermo Brown in the round of sixty-four on 5 July 2017. His league debut arrived on 11 May 2018 versus San Martín.

In January 2019, Álvarez moved to Primera B Metropolitana with Acassuso.

Career statistics
.

References

External links

1994 births
Living people
People from San Martín, Buenos Aires
Argentine footballers
Association football goalkeepers
Argentine Primera División players
Chacarita Juniors footballers
Club Atlético Acassuso footballers
Sportspeople from Buenos Aires Province